Christoph Bergmann (born: 10 May 1963) is a sailor from Brazil, who represented his country at the 1988 Summer Olympics in Busan, South Korea as crew member in the Soling. With helmsman Jose Paulo Dias and fellow crew members Daniel Adler and Jose Augusto Dias they took the 5th place. Bergman took over from Daniel Adler after race five, due to illness of Daniel for race 6 & 7.

References

Living people
1963 births
Sailors at the 1988 Summer Olympics – Soling
Sailors at the 1992 Summer Olympics – Finn
Sailors at the 1996 Summer Olympics – Finn
Sailors at the 2000 Summer Olympics – Finn
Olympic sailors of Brazil
Brazilian male sailors (sport)
Sportspeople from Rio de Janeiro (city)